Irwin Norman Bellow, Baron Bellwin JP DL (7 February 1923 – 11 February 2001) was a British Conservative politician.

Biography 
Bellow was born to a Jewish family in Leeds, and was educated at Leeds Grammar School and the University of Leeds, where he read Law. He then joined the family's sewing-machine firm. Bellow served as the Leader of the Leeds City Council from 1975 to 1979. As council leader, he sold 3,000 council houses and cut rates, which brought him to the attention of Margaret Thatcher.

On 21 May 1979, he was created a life peer as Baron Bellwin, of the City of Leeds. Between 1979 and 1983, Bellwin served as Parliamentary Under-Secretary of State at the Department of the Environment under Michael Heseltine. Between 1983 and 1984 he was Minister of State for the Environment (Local Government).

As a junior minister, Bellwin piloted 28 bills through the House of Lords, including the Thatcher government's 'Right to Buy' legislation and the Wildlife and Countryside Act 1981. He spoke more than 1,000 times in the Lords during the passage of Local Government, Planning and Land Act 1980. The Bellwin scheme, which he introduced in 1983, is named after him. He resigned from the government in 1984, allegedly because of his opposition to Margaret Thatcher's plans to abolish the Labour-dominated metropolitan county councils.

Bellwin was made a Justice of the Peace for Leeds in 1969 and became a Deputy Lieutenant for West Yorkshire in 1991. He was Master of the Worshipful Company of World Traders from 1988 to 1989.

He married Doreen Saperia in 1948; they had one son and two daughters.

Arms

References

External links 
 

1923 births
2001 deaths
Conservative Party (UK) life peers
Life peers created by Elizabeth II
Jewish British politicians
English justices of the peace
Deputy Lieutenants of West Yorkshire
Councillors in Leeds
Alumni of the University of Leeds
People educated at Leeds Grammar School
Politicians from Leeds
Businesspeople from Leeds
20th-century English businesspeople